The Death of Chione is a 1622 painting by Nicolas Poussin, his first known surviving work. He produced it during a stay in Lyon and in February 2016 it was acquired by that city's Museum of Fine Arts. It shows the death of Chione, lover of both Hermes and Apollo - she had compared her beauty to that of Apollo's sister Artemis, who hunted her down and killed her by shooting an arrow through her tongue.

References

Sources

1622 paintings
Paintings by Nicolas Poussin
Paintings depicting Diana (mythology)
Paintings in the collection of the Museum of Fine Arts of Lyon
Paintings about death
Mythological paintings by Nicolas Poussin